The 2015 FIA World Endurance Championship season was the fourth season of the FIA World Endurance Championship auto racing series, co-organized by the Fédération Internationale de l'Automobile (FIA) and the Automobile Club de l'Ouest (ACO). The series was open to Le Mans Prototypes and grand tourer-style racing cars meeting four ACO categories. World championship titles were awarded for Le Mans Prototypes drivers and for manufacturers in the LMP1 category, and several World Endurance Cups and Endurance Trophies were also awarded in all four categories. The season began at the Silverstone Circuit in April and ended at the Bahrain International Circuit in November after eight rounds, and included the 83rd running of the 24 Hours of Le Mans.

Porsche secured the World Manufacturers' Championship at the 6 Hours of Shanghai, beating Audi by eighty points. Porsche's Timo Bernhard, Mark Webber, and Brendon Hartley won the World Drivers' Championship in the final round of the season, ahead of Audi's André Lotterer, Benoît Tréluyer, and Marcel Fässler. Porsche teammates Marc Lieb, Romain Dumas, and Neel Jani were third in the championship standings. Bernhard, Webber, and Hartley won four consecutive races over the course of the season. Porsche also won the World Endurance Cup for GT Manufacturers in the final event, overcoming the lead held by Ferrari earlier in the season. Richard Lietz of Porsche won the World Endurance Cup for GT Drivers over three-time defending Cup winner Gianmaria Bruni and his teammate Toni Vilander.

Rebellion Racing and their drivers Mathias Beche and Nicolas Prost won the trophies for LMP1 class private entries despite not participating in the first two rounds of the championship. The championships were Rebellion's fourth and Beche and Prost's second consecutive trophy titles respectively. Roman Rusinov, Julien Canal, and Sam Bird of G-Drive Racing secured the LMP2 class trophies over the KCMG team. Porsche Team Manthey won the LMGTE Professional category trophy for teams over Ferrari representative AF Corse. The LMGTE Amateur category trophies were won by SMP Racing and their drivers Viktor Shaitar, Aleksey Basov, and Andrea Bertolini, ahead of AF Corse's LMGTE Am entry.

Schedule
A provisional calendar was announced by the ACO at the 2014 6 Hours of Fuji and confirmed at the FIA World Motor Sport Council meeting in Doha shortly after. The schedule remains much the same as 2014, with the notable exception of the 6 Hours of São Paulo being replaced by the 6 Hours of Nürburgring. The planned construction of a new pit complex at the Autódromo José Carlos Pace precluded the event from returning in 2015. The Nürburgring round will be the series' first visit to Germany and will take place between the 24 Hours of Le Mans and 6 Hours of Circuit of the Americas, shortening the over three-month gap that was part of the 2014 schedule by three weeks.

Entries
The FIA unveiled an entry of 35 cars for the 2015 season on 5 February, divided into four categories: Le Mans Prototype 1 (LMP1) and 2 (LMP2), and Le Mans Grand Touring Endurance Professional (LMGTE Pro) and Amateur (LMGTE Am). The entry is the largest in the history of the FIA WEC, and seven more cars than the entry in 2014.

LMP1
The LMP1-H and LMP1-L categories introduced in 2014 are merged once more into a single LMP1 category, allowing the privateer teams to again face the manufacturer teams. Nissan joins the LMP1 category as a manufacturer after supplying engines in LMP2 since the series' inception in 2012. The Nissan GT-R LM Nismo utilizes a unique layout amongst the LMP1 field, with a front-engine design and a front-wheel drive powertrain. Nissan's drivers include FIA GT1 World Champion Michael Krumm, European Le Mans Series LMP2 champion Olivier Pla who moves from G-Drive Racing, and former Formula One driver Max Chilton. LMP2 veterans Harry Tincknell, Jann Mardenborough, and Alex Buncombe complete the team's full season line-up, while Lucas Ordóñez, Mark Shulzhitskiy, and defending Super GT champion Tsugio Matsuda will drive the team's third entry for Le Mans.

Debutants in 2014, Porsche retain their line-up but add a third 919 Hybrid for Le Mans: current Force India Formula One driver Nico Hülkenberg will join Nick Tandy and Earl Bamber who were promoted from Porsche's LMGTE program.

With the retirement of 2013 World Endurance Drivers' champion Tom Kristensen, Audi have promoted Oliver Jarvis to partner with Lucas di Grassi and Loïc Duval in an R18 e-tron quattro. The second Audi retains the same line-up which won the 2012 World Endurance Drivers' championship: Marcel Fässler, Benoît Tréluyer, and André Lotterer. René Rast moves from Audi's GT program to take Jarvis' vacated seat in the third Audi for Le Mans.

Defending World Endurance Drivers' champions Anthony Davidson and Sébastien Buemi gain a new co-driver at Toyota for 2015, as Kazuki Nakajima switches from the sister car to replace the departed Nicolas Lapierre. Nakajima's spot in the second TS040 Hybrid is filled by Mike Conway, promoted from reserve duty in 2014, to partner Stéphane Sarrazin and Alexander Wurz.

The two LMP1-L entries from 2014 remain into the new season but with alterations to their campaigns. Kodewa, previously entered under sponsorship with Lotus Cars, is renamed Team ByKolles for 2015. ByKolles retains the CLM P1/01 with AER power that they campaigned in the second half of 2014. Pierre Kaffer is retained alongside Simon Trummer who appeared with Kodewa for one race in 2014. Vitantonio Liuzzi returns to the team after having previously campaigned the Lotus in LMP2 in 2013. Rebellion Racing come into 2015 as the defending LMP1 Private Teams champions, but have chosen to forgo the Toyota engines for the same AER powerplant used by Team ByKolles. This decision forced Rebellion to withdraw from the first races of the season in order to adapt their R-Ones for the new motors. The No. 12 Rebellion's drivers remain unchanged, while the No. 13 adds series rookie Daniel Abt and former KCMG LMP2 driver Alexandre Imperatori alongside team veteran Dominik Kraihamer.

LMP2

After the LMP2 field in 2014 was the smallest in the history of the WEC, with only four cars competing for the full season despite an initial seven entries in the category, the class has regained popularity with ten entries for 2015. Even with an increase in cars, defending LMP2 champions SMP Racing and driver Sergey Zlobin have opted not to return, instead focusing on the European Le Mans Series to develop their new BR01 chassis. 2013 LMP2 champions OAK Racing return to the series under their own banner for team owner and driver Jacques Nicolet, while their G-Drive Racing operation which won four races in 2014 expands to a two-car operation in 2015. Sam Bird replaces Olivier Pla in the first G-Drive entry alongside Roman Rusinov and Julien Canal, while Gustavo Yacamán, Ricardo González, and Pipo Derani share the second car. All three entries will use the Ligier JS P2-Nissan combination. KCMG also remain in the series for 2015, replacing their Oreca 03 with the newer 05 chassis. Porsche driver Nick Tandy will join KCMG for part of the season when not driving the third Porsche LMP1, while Richard Bradley and Matthew Howson remain with the squad. Former Toyota LMP1 driver Nicolas Lapierre will serve as Tandy's replacement when he is unavailable. Strakka Racing, who had filed a full-season entry in 2014 but failed to participate after development delays with their Strakka Dome S103 chassis, return for 2015 with an unchanged program. Strakka were the only team campaigning Michelin tyres in LMP2 before switching to the Dunlops used by the rest of the category.

Defending European Le Mans Series champions Signatech, retaining drivers' champions Nelson Panciatici and Paul-Loup Chatin and adding Vincent Capillaire to the team. The team, which previously participated in 2012, will have backing from Alpine with their Oreca-based A450 chassis with Nissan power. Morand Racing also shifts from the European Le Mans Series, partnering with the Japanese firm SARD in a joint effort. The team initially entered two improved versions of the Morgan LMP2 with Judd engines, but funding issues forced the team to downsize to a single entry. Former European Le Mans Series drivers' champion Oliver Webb jumps from Signatech to SARD Morand with Pierre Ragues and rookie Zoël Amberg. Extreme Speed Motorsports is the only North American-representative in the series, shifting from the United SportsCar Championship to the WEC with their HPD-Hondas. Team owner Scott Sharp joins Ryan Dalziel, who secured an LMP2 championship for Starworks Motorsport in the 2012 WEC, and David Heinemeier Hansson, who won the LMGTE Am Drivers' championship in 2014. The second HPD-Honda will be crewed by Johannes van Overbeek, Ed Brown, and former Rolex Sports Car Series champion Jon Fogarty.

LMGTE Pro

The LMGTE Pro category remains largely unchanged from 2014 as Porsche, Ferrari, and Aston Martin remain the sole manufacturers involved. Three-time LMGTE champions AF Corse's Ferraris will have a near identical line-up as Gianmaria Bruni and Toni Vilander defend their titles in the lead car, while James Calado and Davide Rigon remain in the second Ferrari. Porsche Team Manthey also keeps the drivers for its two cars largely unchanged. Frédéric Makowiecki, Patrick Pilet, and Wolf Henzler share the No. 92, while Jörg Bergmeister and Richard Lietz remain in the No. 91. Michael Christensen is the newcomer to the No. 91, replacing the promoted Nick Tandy. Aston Martin Racing expands their effort to three cars for 2015 after partner Young Driver's entry, which won the LMGTE Am category in 2014, moves to the Pro class. The all-Danish line-up of Nicki Thiim and Christoffer Nygaard are joined by newcomer Marco Sørensen. Robert Bell takes over Bruno Senna's seat alongside Stefan Mücke and Darren Turner, while Alex MacDowall and Fernando Rees are joined by Richie Stanaway, promoted from Aston Martin's LMGTE Am line-up the previous season.

LMGTE Am

The field in LMGTE Am features teams which have experience in the WEC. Aston Martin Racing retains their two-car entry, with Paul Dalla Lana and Pedro Lamy's car joined by newcomer Mathias Lauda, and Roald Goethe and Stuart Hall returning to the series for the first time since 2013, adding former FIA GT3 European Champion Francesco Castellacci. AF Corse also remains in the category, downgrading from a two-car entry to a single car for 2015. François Perrodo and Emmanuel Collard move from the departed Prospeed Competition Porsche team to campaign AF Corse's Ferrari alongside Rui Águas. Proton Racing keeps their entry with Christian Ried, Klaus Bachler, and Khaled Al Qubaisi, while a second Porsche is added to the squad for actor Patrick Dempsey alongside Porsche factory driver Patrick Long and Marco Seefried. SMP Racing remains in the championship despite not defending their LMP2 championship titles. Viktor Shaytar moves from the LMP2 program to the team's Ferrari while being joined by newcomer to the series Aleksey Basov and Ferrari factory driver Andrea Bertolini. 2012 LMGTE Am Teams' champions Larbre Compétition return to the series for the first time since 2013, campaigning the first customer Chevrolet Corvette C7.R. Gianluca Roda and Paolo Ruberti join the team after 8 Star Motorsports did not return to the series along with 2014 LMGTE Am Drivers' champion Kristian Poulsen.

Regulation changes

The FIA's World Motor Sport Council (WMSC) approved a series of regulation changes for the World Endurance Championship during December 2014. Tyres are limited at each race weekend, bar Le Mans, for the LMP1 and LMGTE categories: each car is allowed four sets of tyres in practice and six during the race. The LMP2 category retains their limit of three sets in practice and four during the race. Tyre manufacturers are also no longer allowed to refuse a supply program with a team. The qualifying format is also altered for the fourth season in a row. Teams will still be required to run two drivers during the qualifying session, but only their best lap is used in determining the qualifying average; previously each driver's best two laps were averaged. LMP2 and LMGTE Am teams are also required to run at least one amateur driver during the qualifying session. A final regulation change is the elimination of the two LMP1 classes introduced in 2014. Regulations will exist for hybrid and non-hybrid LMP1 cars, but all cars are classified under a single LMP1 category. The LMP1 Private Teams trophies are open to non-hybrid LMP1 cars only.

A second meeting of the WMSC in March 2015 approved further regulation changes. The LMP1 category has limits introduced to control the costs for manufacturers including a restriction on the number of personnel involved in operations, the homologation of only a single hybrid drivetrain design, and a maximum of five engines each car can use over the season, with the exception of new manufacturers allowed seven engines in their debut season. Limits are also placed on the number of days teams in all categories can conduct tests outside of races. Further regulation changes proposed are an alteration to the minimum and maximum drive time allowances in the LMP1 and LMGTE Pro categories and a reduction in the duration of the qualifying session from 25 minutes to 20 due to each team only requiring a minimum of two laps instead of four.

Results and standings

Race results
The highest finishing competitor entered in the World Endurance Championship is listed below. Invitational entries may have finished ahead of WEC competitors in individual races.

Entries were required to complete the timed race as well as to complete 70% of the overall winning car's race distance in order to earn championship points. A single bonus point was awarded to the team and all drivers of the pole position car for each category in qualifying. For the 24 Hours of Le Mans, the race result points allocation was doubled. Furthermore, a race must complete three laps under green flag conditions in order for championship points to be awarded.

Drivers' Championships

Five titles are offered to drivers in the 2015 season. The World Championship is reserved for LMP1 and LMP2 drivers while the World Cup for GT Drivers is available for drivers in the LMGTE categories. Further, three FIA Endurance Trophies were also awarded to drivers in the LMP2 and LMGTE Am categories as well as privateers in the LMP1 category.

World Endurance Drivers' Championship

World Endurance Cup for GT Drivers

LMP1 Private Teams Drivers' Trophy

FIA Endurance Trophy for LMP2 Drivers

FIA Endurance Trophy for LMGTE Am Drivers

Manufacturers' Championships
Two manufacturers' titles were contested in the 2015 FIA WEC, one for LMPs and one for LMGTEs. The World Endurance Championship for Manufacturers was only open to manufacturer entries in the LMP1 category, while the World Endurance Cup for GT Manufacturers allowed all entries from registered manufacturers in LMGTE Pro and LMGTE Am to participate. The two top finishing cars from each manufacturer earned points toward their total.

World Endurance Manufacturers' Championship

World Endurance Cup for GT Manufacturers

Teams' Championships
All categories award a team trophy for each individual entry, although LMP1 is limited to entries not from a manufacturer.

FIA Endurance Trophy for Private LMP1 Teams

FIA Endurance Trophy for LMP2 Teams

FIA Endurance Trophy for LMGTE Pro Teams

FIA Endurance Trophy for LMGTE Am Teams

References

External links

 
 2015 FIA World Endurance Championship - Sporting Regulations, www.fia.com, as archived at web.archive.org
 2015 FIA World Endurance Championship - Standings, www.fia.com, as archived at web.archive.org
 FIA World Endurance Championship - Timing Results, fiawec.alkamelsystems.com

 
FIA World Endurance Championship seasons
World Endurance Championship